Rodžers Lodziņš (born 11 December 1969) is a Latvian former bobsledder.  He competed in the two man event at the 1998 Winter Olympics. He won three silver medals (1989, 1993 and 1994) in Junior World Championships for bobsleigh.  In 2016, he started coaching for the Latvian Skeleton Team. His sister Ulla is a former alpine skier.

References

External links
 

1969 births
Living people
Latvian male bobsledders
Olympic bobsledders of Latvia
Bobsledders at the 1998 Winter Olympics
People from Valmiera